Mälzer is a German surname. Notable people with the surname include:

Kurt Mälzer (1894–1952), German Luftwaffe general
Tim Mälzer (born 1971), German chef, restaurateur, author, and television personality

See also
Maler

German-language surnames